Aikatsu Stars! is a Japanese anime television series produced by BN Pictures, and the successor to the original Aikatsu! anime series based on Bandai's Data Carddass arcade machines. The story follows a girl named Yume Nijino who enrolls at Yotsuboshi Gakuen (Four Star Academy) in order to become a top idol and join the popular group S4 which she admires. The series began airing on TV Tokyo from April 7, 2016, succeeding the original Aikatsu! anime series in its initial timeslot. From episode 26 onwards, the opening theme is "1, 2, Sing For you!" by Sena, Rie, Miki and Kana. From episode 34 till episode 50 the opening theme is "STAR JET!" (スタージェット！Sutā Jetto!) by Sena, Rie, Kana and Miki. The ending  theme from episode 26 till episode 50 is "So Beautiful Story" by Ruka and Sena.
In season 2, the opening themes are "STARDOM!" and "MUSIC OF DREAM!!!", both by Sena, Rie, Kana and Miki while the ending themes are "Bon Bon Voyage" by Miho from AIKATSU✩STARS and Risa, and "Pirouette of the Forest Light" by Sena and Ruka from AIKATSU✩STARS.

Episode list

Season 1

Season 2

Aikatsu Stars!
Aikatsu!